The long-nosed snake (Rhinocheilus lecontei) is a species of nonvenomous snake in the family Colubridae. The species is endemic to North America. It has two recognized subspecies.  The other species in the genus were previously considered subspecies.

Etymology
The specific name, lecontei, commemorates American entomologist John Lawrence Le Conte (1825-1883).

Description
The long-nosed snake is distinguished by a long, slightly upturned snout, which is the origin of its common name. It is tricolor, vaguely resembling a coral snake, with black and red saddling on a yellow or cream-colored background. Cream-colored spots within the black saddles are a distinct characteristic of the long-nosed snake. It differs from all other harmless snakes in the United States by having undivided subcaudal scales.

Behavior
R. lecontei is a shy, nocturnal burrowing snake. It spends most of its time buried underground.

Diet
The long-nosed snake feeds on lizards, amphibians, and sometimes smaller snakes and infrequently rodents.

Reproduction
R. lecontei is oviparous, laying clutches of 4-9 eggs in the early summer, which hatch in the late summer or early fall.

Defense
The long-nosed snake is not apt to bite, but will release a foul smelling musk and blood from the cloaca as a defense mechanism if harassed.

Habitat
The preferred natural habitats of the long-nosed snake are desert, grassland, shrubland, and savanna.

Geographic range
R. lecontei is found in northern Mexico from San Luis Potosí to Chihuahua, and into the southwestern United States, in California, Nevada, Utah, Idaho, Arizona, New Mexico,  southeastern Colorado, southwestern Kansas, Oklahoma, and Texas.

Subspecies
Western long-nosed snake, Rhinocheilus lecontei lecontei 
Texas long-nosed snake, Rhinocheilus lecontei tessellatus

In captivity
The long-nosed snake is not often found in the exotic pet trade as it frequently rejects rodent-based diets that are most readily available for captive snakes.

References

External links
USGS: Rhinocheilus lecontei

WhoZoo: Long-nosed Snake
NatureServe Explorer: w/ 2 RangeMaps: Rhinocheilus lecontei.   Click "DISTRIBUTION" for maps.

Further reading
Baird SF, Girard C (1853). Catalogue of North American Reptiles in the Museum of the Smithsonian Institution. Part I.—Serpents. Washington, District of Columbia: Smithsonian Institution. xvi + 172 pp. (Rhinocheilus, new genus, p. 120; R. lecontei, new species, pp. 120–121).
Behler JL, King FW (1979). The Audubon Society Field Guide to North American Reptiles and Amphibians. New York: Alfred A. Knopf. 743 pp. . (Rhinocheilus lecontei, pp. 649-650 + Plates 593, 609).
Conant, Roger, Bridges, William (1939). What Snake Is That? A Field Guide to the Snakes of the United States East of the Rocky Mountains. (With 108 drawings by Edmond Malnate). New York and London: D. Appleton-Century Company. Frontispiece map + viii + 163 pp. + Plates A-C, 1-32. (Rhinocheilus lecontei, p. 86 + Plate 14, Figure 41).
Powell R, Conant R, Collins JT (2016). Peterson Field Guide to Reptiles and Amphibians of Eastern and Central North America, Fourth Edition. Boston and New York: Houghton Mifflin Harcourt. xiv + 494 pp., 47 plates, 207 figures. . (Rhinocheilus lecontei, pp. 392-393 + Plate 37).
Smith HM, Brodie ED Jr (1982). Reptiles of North America: A Guide to Field Identification. New York: Golden Press. 240 pp.  (paperback). (Rhinocheilus lecontei, pp. 164–165).
Stebbins RC (2003). A Field Guide to Western Reptiles and Amphibians, Third Edition. The Peterson Field Guide Series ®. Boston and New York: Houghton Mifflin Company. xiii + 533 pp.  (paperback). (Rhinocheilus lecontei, pp. 370–371 + Plate 44 + Map 155).
Wright AH, Wright AA (1957). Handbook of Snakes of the United States and Canada. Ithaca and London: Comstock Publishing Associates, a Division of Cornell University Press. 1,105 pp. (in 2 volumes) (Genus Rhinocheilus, p. 630-633 + Figure 19 on p. 69). (species Rhinocheilus lecontei, pp. 633–644, Figures 183-187, Map 48).
Zim HS, Smith HM (1956). Reptiles and Amphibians: A Guide to Familiar American Species: A Golden Nature Guide. Revised Edition. New York: Simon and Schuster. 160 pp. ("LONG-NOSED SNAKE", Rhinocheilus lecontei, pp. 101, 156).

Rhinocheilus
Fauna of the Southwestern United States
Reptiles of the United States
Fauna of the Western United States
Reptiles of Mexico
Reptiles described in 1853
Taxa named by Spencer Fullerton Baird
Taxa named by Charles Frédéric Girard